The Daily Telegraph was a newspaper published in Melbourne from 1869 to 1892.

Notable people
J. F. Archibald (1858–1919)
Rev. Dr. William Henry Fitchett editor 1886–1891
Elizee De Garis (1851–1948) irrigation correspondent
Frederick Albert E. Gibson (c. 1854–1933) journalist
Ernest George Henty (1862–1895) journalist 1883–1885
Benjamin Hoare (1842–1932) journalist 1886–1890
Duncan Longden ( –1904)
Joe Melvin (1852–1909) journalist and sub-editor
William Thomas Reay (1858–1929) leader writer and assistant editor
Henry Short, associate editor under Fitchett.
George Thomson ( –1899)
James Thomson (1852–1934) journalist 1874–
Howard Willoughby (1839–1908) editor 1869–1877
C. R. Wilton journalist and editor

References 

Publications established in 1869
Publications disestablished in 1892
Defunct newspapers published in Melbourne
1869 establishments in Australia
Daily newspapers published in Australia